The Blackburn Bus Company operates both local and regional bus services in Greater Manchester and Lancashire, England. It is a subsidiary of Transdev Blazefield, which operates bus services across Greater Manchester, Lancashire, North Yorkshire and West Yorkshire.

History
In April 2001, Stagecoach sold their operations in Blackburn, Bolton and Clitheroe to the Blazefield Group, which rebranded them as Burnley & Pendle and Lancashire United. The sale was valued at £13 million. Prior to the sale, many of the newer vehicles purchased following earlier investment by Stagecoach were transferred to other subsidiaries, being replaced by older vehicles.

Following the sale, investment commenced with a fleet of 30 Volvo B10BLE/Wright Renown single-deck vehicles introduced into service in September 2001. A number of service revisions followed and many marginal services were withdrawn, with a strategy of developing a network of high-quality trunk routes. Most of the company's contracted services with Lancashire County Council were terminated, with operations transferred to Northern Blue.

In August 2002, the company's depot in Bolton was sold to Blue Bus and Coach Services. The contracted services in Clitheroe were ceased, with the land sold to a housing developer. Operation of the majority of the contracted services in the area was transferred to Northern Blue.

In January 2006, French-based operator Transdev acquired the Blazefield Group, along with 305 vehicles. Unlike other subsidiaries within the group, Lancashire United retained the pre-acquisition name.

In August 2006, Blackburn with Darwen Borough Council announced that after 125 years of municipal ownership, Blackburn Transport had been sold to Transdev Blazefield. The sale was finalised in January 2007.

In August 2007, Accrington Transport and Northern Blue were acquired, along with the transfer of staff and 65 vehicles. This resulted in services in Clitheroe being reacquired by Lancashire United for a second time. However, these services were subsequently withdrawn in June 2008. In September 2009, Transdev Northern Blue was integrated into the Transdev Burnley & Pendle business.

In July 2016, the company was again rebranded, now operating as The Blackburn Bus Company.

In April 2019, the company commemorated the centenary of Ribble Motor Services with a dedicated livery.

In June 2020, an Optare Versa was branded in a unique livery, recognising the dedication of Lancashire's key workers during the COVID-19 pandemic.

Services and brands

The Blackburn Bus Company
A rebrand of the company commenced in July 2016, beginning with the introduction of a fleet of Optare Versa single-deck vehicles, branded in the two-tone blue The Blackburn Bus Company livery. The brand encompasses a number of local services in the area, as well as being used as a base for other route brands, including The 1 and 6 & 7.

The 1
Following a £2.5 million investment in the service, The 1 was rebranded in January 2020. The service, which operates between Blackburn and Darwen up to every ten minutes, with up to three buses per hour extending to Bolton, is served by a fleet of Alexander Dennis Enviro 200 MMC single-deck vehicles. Features include free WiFi, USB and wireless charging and audio-visual next stop announcements.

6 & 7
Following the arrival of a batch of Optare Versa single-deck vehicles in July 2016, the former Hyndburn Connect branding was replaced by a new two-tone blue 6 & 7 livery. The vehicles were introduced to routes 6 and 7, which run between Accrington and Blackburn, in August 2016. Features include WiFi, USB charging and audio-visual next stop announcements.

Hotline & Little Hotline
In 2016, service 152, which operates between Burnley and Preston via Blackburn was rebranded as Hotline. Initially using Volvo B7TL/Wright Gemini double-deck vehicles, the service was upgraded in February 2020. It is now operated by a fleet of Volvo B9TL/Wright Gemini 2 double-deck vehicles, branded in a two-tone purple livery. Features include free WiFi, USB charging and audio-visual next stop announcements.

In partnership with Lancashire County Council, the Little Hotline brand was introduced in May 2021. Together with Hotline, service 153 provides a combined frequency of up to every 15 minutes between Higher Walton and Preston. The service is operated by a fleet of Mellor Strata minibuses, branded in a two-tone purple livery. Features include free WiFi, USB charging and audio-visual next stop announcements.

Red Express X41
The Red Express brand is used on service X41, which operates hourly between Accrington and Manchester via Haslingden. In January 2020, the service was announced to be axed, but was later reprieved. As part of this, the former double-deck Volvo B7TL/Wright Gemini vehicles allocated were replaced with single-deck Volvo B7RLE/Wright Eclipse Urban vehicles, branded in a two-tone yellow and red livery. Features include free WiFi, USB charging and audio-visual next stop announcements.

Valley Line
The Valley Line brand is used on service 22, which links Blackburn and Clitheroe via Whalley. The service is operated by a fleet of Volvo B10BLE/Wright Renown single-deck vehicles, branded in a two-tone blue and yellow livery. Features include free WiFi and USB charging.

Fleet

Depots 
As of April 2022, the company operates from a single depot in Blackburn (Intack), which was formerly operated by Blackburn Transport. The former Stagecoach Ribble depot in Blackburn (Manner Sutton Street) was closed in August 2011, with operations subsequently merged with Intack.

Vehicles 
As of November 2020, the fleet consists of 57 buses. The fleet consists of diesel-powered single and double-deck buses manufactured by Alexander Dennis, Optare and Volvo, as well as minibuses manufactured by Mellor.

References

External links

Lancashire United Limited and Transdev Blazefield on Companies House
The Blackburn Bus Company website

Bus operators in Greater Manchester
Bus operators in Lancashire
Companies based in Blackburn
Transdev
Transport in Blackburn with Darwen